The Denver Film Festival is held in November, primarily at the Denver Film Center/Colfax, in Denver, Colorado, now the Anna and John J. Sie FilmCenter (Sie FilmCenter). Premiere events are held in the Buell Theatre and Ellie Caulkins Opera House at the Denver Performing Arts Complex. Before 2012, It was held in the Tivoli Union on the Auraria Campus.

Information
The festival features a diverse selection of films, ranging from independent to commercial from all over the world and is well attended by filmmakers. The festival is currently managed by the Denver Film Society and sponsored by Starz.

History 
The first festival was held on May 4, 1978, and featured such films as Annie Hall, The Fury, Close Encounters of the Third Kind, The Hills Have Eyes and Pretty Baby. The festival kicked off with a 90-minute clip compilation from Warner Bros. titled ‘The Movies That Made Us.’ The festival was originally conceived and founded by Peter Warren, Ph.D., then a professor of mathematics at the University of Denver and by Irene Clurman, then the art critic for the Rocky Mountain News. The first artistic director was Ron Hecht, the manager of the Vogue theatre.

In the early years, Ron Henderson served as marketing director and subsequently as artistic director. Henderson recalls "There were no red carpets and no television cameras out front. We did a ribbon cutting with Dick Lamm (then governor). When we got inside it was a full house at the Old Centre theater, which was demolished before the next year's festival. (The Centre sat 1,200.).

"Most notably, the weather was ominous - cloudy and cool. The opening-night party was at a private house and it was an invitational affair. When we got there, a cold rain was falling. We woke up the next morning, and there was a foot of wet snow on the ground, but it was springtime and by the end of the day, it was beautiful.

"The first festival obviously was very successful, so we decided to take it to a second year. It was really three years before we finally said, 'OK, this is a real thing, let's hire staff and incorporate as a nonprofit.' "

28th Denver Film Festival 
The 28th Starz Denver Film Festival was held November 10–20, 2005.

Special tributes were given to Claude Lelouch and Ryuichi Hiroki. The festival also included a focus on Japanese Cinema.

29th Denver Film Festival 
The 29th Starz Denver Film Festival was held November 9–19, 2006 and featured 194 titles from 29 countries. 15 films were premiered. The festival was attended by 38,881 film goers and more than 180 filmmakers. The opening night film was 'Breaking and Entering' and the closing night film was Rescue Dawn. 

Special tributes were given to Vilmos Zsigmond, Wu Tian Ming, Scott Wilson and Allan King. The festival also included a focus on Canadian Cinema.

30th Denver Film Festival 
The 30th Starz Denver Film Festival was held November 8 – 18, 2007. The official line-up was announced October 22.

31st Denver Film Festival 
The 31st Starz Denver Film Festival was held November 13–23, 2008. The featured Red Carpet events were screenings of The Brothers Bloom, Slumdog Millionaire and Last Chance Harvey.

32nd Denver Film Festival 
The 32nd Denver Film Festival was held November 12–22, 2009. The featured Red Carpet films included Precious, The Last Station and The Young Victoria.

33rd Denver Film Festival 
Festival was held November 3–14, 2010. It screened over 200 films and included a Focus on Iranian Cinema. Red Carpet Events including a screening of Morning, Rabbit Hole, Casino Jack, 127 Hours and Black Swan. The festival was dedicated to director George Hickenlooper who died in Denver just days before his film Casino Jack screened at the Festival.

34th Denver Film Festival 
The 2011 Festival was held November 2–13, with 247 Films programmed, including a Focus on South Korean Cinema. Red Carpet screenings included Like Crazy, The Descendants, and The Artist. This was the last year the festival held screenings at the Starz Film Center on the Auraria Campus. The 2011 Award Winners are listed below.

35th Denver Film Festival 
The 2012 festival was held November 1–11. It included a Focus on the Cinema of Argentina with 13 Argentine films in the program. Red Carpet events included the opening night film A Late Quartet, Dustin Hoffman's directorial debut, Quartet and the closing night film, Silver Linings Playbook. Special events at the festival included tributes to Dutch filmmaker Mijke de Jong, Argentine filmmaker Daniel Burman, Boulder, Colorado, filmmaker Stacey Steers, and the Colorado filmmaking collective, Milkhaus. Celebrity guests who were present to receive festival awards or for special presentations included, Tippi Hedren, George Romero, Andy Garcia, Vince Vaughn and Jason Ritter. Additional screenings were held at the Denver Pavilions off of 16th Street Mall. The 2012 award winners are below.

36th Denver Film Festival 
The 2013 festival was held November 6–17, with a focus on Dutch Cinema. Red carpet screenings included, Labor Day, Nebraska and August: Osage County. The 2013 award winners are below.

37th Denver Film Festival 
The 2014 Starz Denver Film Festival was held November 12–23. The 2014 award winners are below.

42nd Denver Film Festival (DFF42) 

The 2019 Denver Film Festival was held from October 30 to November 10, 2019. After conclusion of the Festival, the following films were recognized as the Audience Award winners for the 42nd Denver Film Festival by a tally of ballots.

Awards previously given or announced:

Maria and Tommaso Maglione Italian Filmmaker Award

THE INVISIBLE WITNESS (IL TESTIMONE INVISIBILE)
Director: Stefano Mordini

John Cassavetes Award Recipient:

RIAN JOHNSON

Stan Brakhage Vision Award Recipient:

VINCENT GRENIER

Brit Withey Artistic Director Fund Recipient:

GYÖRGY PÁLFI

See also
 Starz

Notes

External links
 Denver Film Society

Film festivals established in 1978
Film festivals in Colorado
Festivals in Denver
Underground film festivals
1978 establishments in Colorado
Virtual reality companies
American companies established in 1978
Entertainment companies established in 1978